Metalloendopeptidase OMA1, mitochondrial is an enzyme that in humans is encoded by the OMA1 gene. OMA1 is a Zn2+-dependent metalloendopeptidase in the inner membrane of mitochondria. The OMA1 acronym was derived from overlapping proteolytic activity with m-AAA protease 1.

The OMA1 protease acts at the intersection of a mitochondrial quality control system and energy metabolism, whereby its activation correlates with outer membrane permeabilization and cytochrome c release in the context of apoptosis.

Mammalian OMA1 can cleave the inner-membrane shaping protein OPA1 and the signaling peptide DELE1 in a context-dependent manner.

Gene 
The human OMA1 gene spans with 9 exons 66 kb of the reverse strand of the short arm of chromosome 1 (1p32.2-p32.1). OMA1 is conserved and homologues have been identified in model organisms, such as mice and yeast. Yet, no homologous have been found in C. elegans and drosophila.

Structure 
The human OMA1 protein comprises 524 amino acids. The nuclear encoded protein exhibits an amino-terminal mitochondrial import sequence, which is removed upon import giving rise to a 43.8 kDa mature protease. OMA1 has a HEXXH Zn2+-binding motive and the MEROPS database classifies OMA1 as metalloendopeptidase of the M48C-family. OMA1’s structure has not yet been resolved. Two controversial models describe OMA1 either as membrane-anchored protease or as integral membrane protease. Google’s AlphaFold predictions are more aligned with the latter model, but have so far not provided a realistic 3D structure. OMA1’s context-dependent regulation is not understood. The mammalian protein has an extended carboxy-terminus, which may be involved in its regulation.

Function 
OMA1’s function evolved over time with distinct substrates in invertebrates and mammals. Initially described in yeast as “a novel component of the quality control system in the inner membrane of mitochondria,” mammalian OMA1 is responsible for stress-dependent OPA1 cleavage. Apoptotic stimuli, such as Bax and Bak, as well as other factors can trigger OMA1 activation and OPA1 processing, which are correlated with outer membrane permeabilization and cytochrome c release. The DELE1 protein is another OMA1 substrate, which is released upon cleavage into the cytosol, where it can activate the integrated stress response. OMA1 and the i-AAA protease share the OPA1 substrate and were suggested to regulate each other by reciprocal proteolytic hydrolysis. OMA1 functionally interacts with the eponymous m-AAA protease and other scaffold proteins in the inner membrane, such as the prohibitins PHB1 and PHB2.

Clinical significance
OMA1 is not directly linked to a specific disease. 3 heterozygous coding sequence variants of uncertain significance were identified in the OMA1 gene in a screen of 190 individuals with Amyotrophic Lateral Sclerosis. Whole exome sequencing of 1,000 individuals with heart failure revealed an association with the coding polymorphism rs17117699 (OMA1 p.Phe211Cys).  OMA1 may still have disease relevance through its substrates OPA1 and DELE1. Also certain misrouted PINK1 mutants pertaining to Parkinson’s disease were found to be digested by OMA1. Conditional OMA1 activation in neurons led to neurodegeneration with tau hyperphosphorylation in mice. OMA1 knockout mice by contrast show mild energy-metabolic alterations without apparent impact on survival or lifespan. OMA1 was also suggested to be relevant for cancer given OMA1’s energy-metabolic regulation and stress-dependent signaling.

References